The Abia State Ministry of Housing is an Abia State Government ministry responsible for policies on public housing and spatial planning in Abia State. It is located in Umuahia, the state's capital

See also
Abia State Government

References

Government ministries of Abia State
Public housing in Nigeria
Abia